Boyd Obunikechukwu Okwuonu (born February 24, 1993) is an American soccer player.

Career

Youth, college and amateur
Okwuonu was a member of both the U.S. Soccer Residency program and the FC Dallas Development Academy program before spending his entire college career at the University of North Carolina.  He made a total of 89 appearances for the Tar Heels and was named to the All-ACC First Team three years in a row. Okwuonu also played in the Premier Development League for Carolina Dynamo and Orlando City U-23.

Professional
On January 15, 2015, Okwuonu was selected in the second round (27th overall) of the 2015 MLS SuperDraft by Real Salt Lake.  On March 20, he was sent on loan to USL affiliate club Real Monarchs SLC.  He made his professional debut two days later in a goalless draw on the road against LA Galaxy II.

International
Okwuonu was a member of the U.S. under-17 national team at the 2009 FIFA U-17 World Cup.  He also represented the U.S. at the U18, U20 and U23 level.

References

External links

North Carolina Tar Heels bio

1993 births
Living people
American sportspeople of Nigerian descent
American soccer players
Association football defenders
North Carolina Fusion U23 players
Major League Soccer players
North Carolina Tar Heels men's soccer players
Orlando City U-23 players
Real Monarchs players
Real Salt Lake draft picks
Real Salt Lake players
Soccer players from Oklahoma
Sportspeople from Edmond, Oklahoma
USL Championship players
United States men's youth international soccer players
United States men's under-20 international soccer players
United States men's under-23 international soccer players
USL League Two players